The Russia national under-21 football team is overseen by the Russian Football Union. The team competed in the European Under-21 Football Championship, held every two years, and international friendly matches. The team also participated in the qualification for the Olympic Games.

On 28 February 2022, in accordance with a recommendation by the International Olympic Committee (IOC), FIFA and UEFA suspended the participation of Russia, including in the Qatar 2022 World Cup. The Russian Football Union unsuccessfully appealed the FIFA and UEFA bans to the Court of Arbitration for Sport, which upheld the bans.

History

UEFA U-21 Championship Record
FIFA considers Russia the direct successor to the Soviet Union, and therefore the inheritor to all its records.
 Champions   Runners-up   Third Place   Fourth Place

*Draws include knockout matches decided by penalty shootout.

Olympic Games

Honours 
 UEFA European Under-21 Championship
 Winners: 1980, 1990
 CIS Cup
 Champions: 2012, 2013, 2016
 Toulon Tournament
 Champions: 1979

Coaches

Current squad 

The following players have been called up for a training camp that will take place from 13 to 16 November 2022 in Novogorsk and Belgrade, the squad will play a friendly with the opponent not yet confirmed.

The caps and goals are correct after the match against Kazakhstan on 24 September 2022.

|-----
! colspan="9" bgcolor="#B0D3FB" align="left" |
|----- bgcolor="#DFEDFD"

|-----
! colspan="9" bgcolor="#B0D3FB" align="left" |
|----- bgcolor="#DFEDFD"

|-----
! colspan="9" bgcolor="#B0D3FB" align="left" |
|----- bgcolor="#DFEDFD"

Recent call-ups
The following players have been called up for the team within the last 12 months and are still eligible for selection.

|-----
|-----
! colspan="9" bgcolor="#B0D3FB" align="left" |
|----- bgcolor="#DFEDFD"
|-----
! colspan="9" bgcolor="#B0D3FB" align="left" |
|----- bgcolor="#DFEDFD"
! colspan="9" bgcolor="#B0D3FB" align="left" |
|----- bgcolor="#DFEDFD"

|-----
! colspan="9" bgcolor="#B0D3FB" align="left" |
|----- bgcolor="#DFEDFD"

See also 
 Soviet Union national under-21 football team
 Russia national football team
 Russia national under-19 football team
 Russia national under-17 football team
 European Under-21 Football Championship

References

External links 
 Russia U21 at uefa.com
 Russia U21 at Rusteam

Under-21
European national under-21 association football teams